Charles Hadfield may refer to:
 Charles Hadfield (journalist) (1821–1884), English journalist
 Charles Hadfield (historian) (1909–1996), British canal historian